Sergeikha is a rural locality (a village) and the administrative center of Sergeikhinskoye Rural Settlement, Kameshkovsky District, Vladimir Oblast, Russia. The population was 902 as of 2010. There are 6 streets.

Geography 
Sergeikha is located 20 km northwest of Kameshkovo (the district's administrative centre) by road. Plyasitsyno is the nearest rural locality.

References 

Rural localities in Kameshkovsky District